Ramadani is an Albanian surname. Notable people with the surname include:

Agim Ramadani (1963–1999), Albanian writer
Ylber Ramadani (born 1996), Albanian footballer
Zana Ramadani (born 1984), German activist, politician and writer
Zedi Ramadani (born 1985), Croatian footballer
Xhemajl Ramadani (1930-2017), Albanian painter

Albanian-language surnames